The following is a list of the prominent names in U.S. Marine Corps lore—the people who make up what the Marines call "knowledge". Names in this list are notable for actions made as a Marine; individuals whose notability is unrelated to service in uniform can be found at List of United States Marines.

Medal of Honor recipients 

 John Basilone – only enlisted Marine Medal of Honor recipient to return to combat and be killed
 Gregory "Pappy" Boyington – commanded the "Black Sheep Squadron" (VMA-214) during WWII
 Smedley Butler – awarded two Medals of Honor for two different acts, outspoken critic of war profiteers, testified in Congress regarding a plot to overthrow the government
 Louis Cukela – awarded both Navy and Army Medals of Honor
 Daniel Daly – awarded two Medals of Honor for two different acts in two different conflicts; nominated for a third but denied because a limit of two had been enacted
 Merritt A. Edson – commander of the 1st Marine Raider Battalion
 Joe Foss – leading fighter ace of the Marine Corps during World War II and the Guadalcanal campaign
 Allan J. Kellogg – platoon sergeant of Company G, 2nd Battalion, 5th Marines, 1st Marine Division, during the Vietnam War.
 Jacklyn H. Lucas – youngest Marine to receive the Medal of Honor
 John F. Mackie – first Marine awarded the Medal of Honor
France Silva – first Hispanic Marine to be awarded the Medal of Honor
 John Lucian Smith – flying ace in the Guadalcanal campaign
 Louis H. Wilson Jr. – commanding officer of Company F, Second Battalion, Ninth Marines, Third Marine Division, in action against enemy Japanese forces at Fonte Hill, Guam, Marianas Islands
 David M. Shoup – was a general of the United States Marine Corps who was awarded the Medal of Honor in World War II, served as the 22nd Commandant of the Marine Corps, and, after retiring, became one of the most prominent critics of the Vietnam War.

Marine Corps firsts 

 Vernice Armour – first female African-American combat pilot in United States military
 Bryan B. Battaglia – first Marine appointed Senior Enlisted Advisor to the Chairman of the Joint Chiefs of Staff
 Frederick C. Branch – first African-American Marine officer
 Marion Carl – first Marine ace (18.5 victories), member of the Cactus Air Force, first Marine helicopter pilot
 John L. Estrada – first Hispanic Sergeant Major of the Marine Corps
 Annie Neal Graham – first African-American woman Marine
 John Glenn – first Marine astronaut, first American to orbit the Earth
 Opha May Johnson – first woman Marine
 James L. Jones Sr. – commanded the Observer Group, the first amphibious reconnaissance unit in the United States; father of James L. Jones Jr., the 32nd Commandant of the Marine Corps
 Kurt Chew-Een Lee – first Chinese-American Marine officer. Led an infantry platoon at the Battle of Chosin Reservoir and was awarded the Navy Cross for his heroism.
 Alfred Masters – first African American Marine
 Dennis M. McCarthy – first reserve general officer to command an active duty Marine division
 Alford L. McMichael – first African American Marine to serve as Sergeant Major of the Marine Corps
 Samuel Nicholas – first Commandant of the Marine Corps
 Presley O'Bannon – first to raise the U.S. Flag over foreign soil as a result of combat, "Hero of Derna" which are the "shores of Tripoli" in the Marine hymn
 Peter Pace – first Marine to become the Chairman of the Joint Chiefs of Staff
 Frank E. Petersen – first African-American aviator Marine, first African-American Marine general, first African-American to command a fighter squadron, a fighter air group, an air wing and a major base.
 Staff Sergeant Reckless – first horse to hold an official rank in the United States Marines and U.S. military in general.
 Angela Salinas – first Hispanic female to obtain a general rank in the Marines
 Pedro del Valle – first Hispanic to reach the rank of lieutenant general, played an instrumental role in defeating Japanese forces during the Battle of Okinawa
 Minnie Spotted-Wolf – first enlisted Native American woman Marine

Other prominent Marines

 John F. Bolt – only Marine aviator to achieve the title of ace in both WWII and the Korean War; remains to this day the only Marine jet aircraft ace
 Evans Carlson – commanded the World War II Marine Raiders, also credited with introducing the term Gung ho into the Marine Corps.
 Alfred Cunningham – patron of Marine Corps aviation, innovative thinker in introducing air support, helped create the Advanced Base Force
 Lou Diamond – "Mr. Leatherneck," namesake of the actor Lou Diamond Phillips
 Earl H. Ellis – conducted espionage missions in Micronesia that influenced the planning of the island-hopping campaigns of World War II
 Guy Gabaldon – captured (or persuaded to surrender) about 1,000 Japanese soldiers and numerous civilians during the Battle of Saipan
 Carlos Hathcock – renowned Marine sniper with 93 confirmed kills during the Vietnam War
 Ira Hayes – Native American flag raiser on Iwo Jima during World War II
 Archibald Henderson – "Grand old man of the Marine Corps," longest-serving Commandant of the Marine Corps (1820–1859)
 Albert L. Ireland – received nine Purple Hearts, the most of any Marine
 Victor H. Krulak – developed new concepts in expeditionary warfare, such as use of Higgins landing craft and helicopters; father of Charles C. Krulak, 31st Commandant of the Marine Corps
 Robert Leckie – served with the 1st Marine Division during World War II; in later life an author of books including Helmet for My Pillow
 John A. Lejeune – 13th Commandant of the Marine Corps, Commanding General of the U.S. Army's 2nd Infantry Division, and author of the birthday message read aloud at every Marine Corps Birthday Ball ceremony
 James Mattis – American veteran and former government official who served as the 26th United States Secretary of Defense from January 2017 through December 2018
 Chuck Mawhinney – Marine sniper with the most confirmed kills, all occurring during the Vietnam War
 Lewis Burwell "Chesty" Puller – received five Navy Crosses and the Army Distinguished Service Cross
 John Ripley – highly decorated Marine, only living person (at the time) to be memorialized in the Naval Academy's museum, first Marine inducted into the Ranger hall of fame
 Lawson H. M. Sanderson – aviation pioneer, father of dive bombing technique
 Eugene Sledge – author of the 1981 memoir With the Old Breed: At Peleliu and Okinawa, which chronicled his combat experiences during World War II
 George O. Van Orden – brigadier general and "Father of Marine Snipers"
 Donald M. Weller – major general and pioneer of Naval gunfire support
 William J. Whaling – major general and highly decorated Marine, created the basics for Marine Scout and sniper Company and for Marine Recon
 Dion Williams – patron of naval and amphibious reconnaissance, hoisted the first American flag raised over Spanish soil in the Spanish–American War

See also

 List of United States Marine Corps astronauts
 List of United States Marine Corps four-star generals
 List of Medal of Honor recipients
 List of 1st Marine Aircraft Wing Commanders
 List of 1st Marine Division Commanders
 List of 2nd Marine Division Commanders
 List of 3rd Marine Division Commanders

References

Sources

External links
 USMC History Division Who's Who

Famous
United States Marine Corps personnel
History of the United States Marine Corps